A reseller is a company or individual (merchant) that purchases goods or services with the intention of selling them rather than consuming or using them. This is usually done for profit (but can be done at a loss). One example can be found in the industry of telecommunications, where companies buy excess amounts of transmission capacity or call time from other carriers and resell it to smaller carriers.

According to the Institute for Partner Education & Development, a reseller's product fulfillment–based business model includes a corporate reseller, retail seller, direct market reseller (DMR), and an internet retailer (eTailer); less than 10 percent of its revenue comes from services.

Internet
Resellers are known to conduct operations on the Internet through sites on the web.

For example, this occurs where individuals or companies act as agents for ICANN accredited registrars. They either sell on commission or for profit and in most cases, but not all, the purchase from the registrar and the sale to the ultimate buyer occurs in real time. These resellers are not to be confused with speculators, who purchase many domain names with the intention of holding them and selling them at some future time at a profit. Resellers, by the very nature of their business are retailers, not wholesalers.  It is not unheard of for online pawn shops like iPawn to also act as a reseller, and purchase rather than loan against valuables.  Online auction and classifieds websites, such as those owned by eBay Inc. and Craigslist provide services for resellers to sell their goods and services.  However although resellers are indeed retailers it does not follow that retailers are resellers.

Another common example of this is in the web hosting area, where a reseller will purchase bulk hosting from a supplier with the intention of reselling it to a number of consumers at a profit.

Software and ebooks
Software and ebooks are two products that are very easy to obtain by resellers.  Their digital format makes them ideal for internet distribution.  In many cases, such as brandable software, the reseller can obtain even the right to change the name of the software and claim it as one's own and resell it on an ebook shop hosting platform.

A software reseller is a consultant who sells the software from large companies under a licence. They have no legal employment status with the parent company and generally operate on a freelance basis.

Business model 
The companies visited to and pitched to by software resellers are often small and medium enterprises (SMEs), local businesses and niche operators. This benefits the software house as they may not hold the resources for the legwork needed to spread their network on a lower scale. While it benefits the reseller because he/she can build up networks of smaller clients and become a single point of contact for them for every aspect concerned with the software, be it advice, training or updating.

Web resellers 
A subcategory of reseller is a web operative who will buy a large amount of hosting space from an Internet service provider (ISP) and then resell some of this space to clients. Their hosting is often managed through a virtual private server (VPS) which allows them, through a control panel, to administer bandwidth, databases, passwords etc, for the client.

The popularity of this business model grew with the rise of freelance web designers as it enabled them to be the sole service provider for the client. After an initial consultation with the client they could subsequently design, develop and also host the site as a single operation.

See also
 Arbitrage
 Price discrimination
 First-sale doctrine
 Secondary market
 Recommerce

References

External links

Sales